William Malpass (5 March 1867 – 1939) was an English footballer who played in the Football League for Wolverhampton Wanderers. Famous musical composer and Wolves supporter Edward Elgar wrote one of the first football chants "He Banged The Leather for Goal" in honour of Malpass.

References

1867 births
1939 deaths
English footballers
Association football midfielders
English Football League players
Wednesbury Old Athletic F.C. players
Wolverhampton Wanderers F.C. players
Sportspeople from Wednesbury
FA Cup Final players